Matthew John Hann (born 6 September 1980) is an English former footballer who played as a midfielder. He played for Cambridge United, Peterborough United, Cambridge City, Eastleigh, Dorchester Town and St Albans City as well as having loan spells with Stamford and Bishop's Stortford. 
He plays mainly on the right side of midfield, but can also play as a striker. He was sold to Eastleigh in 2007 when new St Albans City boss Ritchie Hanlon was unimpressed by him.

In 2008, Hann was one of the first signings of Paul Doswell at Sutton United. Doswell was Hann's Manager at Eastleigh. Hann played for 2 seasons, and scored the winning goal to send Sutton United into the first round of the FA Cup in 2008 for the first time since 1995. His second season for Sutton was blighted by injury and he announced his retirement at the end of the 2009–10 season. His last game for Sutton United was as an unused substitute in the Isthmian League match at home to Hendon on 27 March 2010.

Hann attended Bournemouth University, where he graduated with a BA Business Studies.

External links

1980 births
Living people
People from Saffron Walden
English footballers
Association football midfielders
Cambridge United F.C. players
Peterborough United F.C. players
Stamford A.F.C. players
Bishop's Stortford F.C. players
Cambridge City F.C. players
Dorchester Town F.C. players
St Albans City F.C. players
Sutton United F.C. players
English Football League players
Alumni of Bournemouth University